Lashkari Bazar (  "Military market", locally known as  Qala-e-Kohna "Old castle") was a palatial residence of rulers of the Ghaznavid Empire, located in Lashkargah in Afghanistan. The original name was probably al-'Askar.

History

Some structural elements of the site date to the Parthian period. The Center palace (32x52 meters) is thought to be dating from the Samanid period (819-999 CE). The area had been conquered by the Arabs as early as 661 CE, and developed to become a large and wealthy city.

The very large South Palace (170x100 meters) was probably founded by Mahmud of Ghazni (998-1030 CE), and expanded by his son Masud I (1030-41 CE). The palaces in Lashkari Bazar were the winter retreat of the Ghaznavid rulers, whose capital was in Ghazni.  The South Palace was richly decorated with stucco, paintings, frescoes and carved marble panels. A large market street about 100 meters long, a bazar, joins the palace structure.

The Northern palace was constructed by later rulers.

The later Ghurid dynasty sacked the palaces in 1151 CE, but later restored them, and some portions of the architecture are attributed to them. They built the fortress of Qala-e-Bost about 7 kilometers to the south, together with an architectural arch.

Recently the ruins have been invested by Afghan refugees fleeing Taliban violence.

Paintings from Lashkari Bazar

References

Helmand Province
Ruins in Afghanistan
Forts in Afghanistan
Palaces in Afghanistan
Buildings and structures in Helmand Province